Edith of Wilton ( – 16 September 984) was an English nun, saint, and the only daughter of Edgar, King of England (r. 959–975), and Saint Wulfthryth, who later became abbess of Wilton Abbey. Edgar most likely abducted Wulfthryth from Wilton; when Edith was an infant, Wulfthryth brought her back to the convent, and they both remained there for the rest of their lives.

Like her mother, Edith was educated at Wilton. Edith chose to enter the religious life from a very early age, although there is some debate regarding whether she became a nun or a secular member of the Wilton community. Goscelin, who completed her hagiography around 1080, reports that Edith "always dressed magnificantly" because her status as a member of the royal family obligated her to fulfill certain roles to ensure the continued royal patronage of the Wilton community. Goscelin based his Vita on the oral testimony of the Wilton nuns and their abbess, as well as on existing written sources. The work was dedicated to Lanfranc, the Archbishop of Canterbury.

When Edith was 15, her father offered her the position of abbess of three convents, which she refused. In 978, after the murder of her half-brother Edward the Martyr, she might have been offered the English throne, which she also refused.

In 984, Edith built a chapel at Wilton Abbey dedicated to St Denys. The chapel was dedicated by the Archbishop of Canterbury, St Dunstan, who foretold her immanent death and that the thumb on her right hand would remain uncorrupted. She died three weeks later, at the age of 23, on September 16, 984 and as she instructed, was buried at the chapel she built. Dunstan presided at her translation, which occurred on November 3, 987; her thumb, as Dunstan had foretold, had not decomposed.

Few miracles were performed to support Edith's sainthood and her cult did not become popular and widespread for 13 years after her death. Many of the miracles that occurred later focused on the protection of Edith's relics and the property owned by the Wilton community, often to retaliate, at times violently, against those who wanted to take or steal them. The support of Edith's elevation to sainthood by both secular and religious authorities was most likely political, in order to establish the legitimacy of their power and to connect themselves to King Edgar's children.

Life

Birth and childhood 
Edith, the patron saint of Wilton Abbey, a Benedictine convent in Wiltshire, England, near Salisbury, was born c. 961 in Kemsing, in Kent, England. She was the only daughter of Edgar and Wulfthryth, a member of the royal family, who was educated at Wilton and later became its abbess. There is some dispute that Edith's parents were married; historian Susan J. Ridyard calls Wulfthryth Edgar's "wife or concubine" and the Oxford Dictionary of Saints calls Wulfthryth his concubine, but most historians, including Edith's hagiographer Goscelin, state that she was Edgar's wife. When Edith was an infant, her parents' marriage was dissolved, which allowed Edgar to remarry; scholar Sabine Baring-Gould, writing in 1875, states that Edgar "carried off the young [Wulfthryth] from Wilton Abbey, where she was being educated...[and] flying from her ravisher, [she] took refuge in Wilton Abbey, where she assumed the veil, and there brought up her daughter Edith, who was trained from her mother's breast in a convent". Edith was dedicated to enter the religious life at Wilton as an infant; her mother was dedicated as a nun shortly afterwards. Hagiographer Agnes Dunbar reported that Edgar, under the direction of his bishop, Dunstan, did penance for kidnapping Wulfthryth and marrying her against her will, by not wearing his crown for seven years.

Edgar arranged that Edith be educated at Wilton by "two foreign chaplains", Radbod of Rheims and Benno of Trier, in order to provide her with the best possible education. Dunbar states that Edith became a nun at Wilton "very early with her father's consent", but scholar Stephanie Hollis believes that Edith remained a lay member of the community, choosing at the age of two to stay there with her mother instead of living at the royal court until her death in c. 984. For example, Hollis calls Edith's status as a member of the Wilton community "ambiguous", stating that she was a secular member rather than a professed nun. Goscelin, however, relates a story about Edith that Ridyard considers similar to many stories told by hagiographers to emphasize both the royal status of many saints and their choice to renounce it for the religious life. When Edith was two years old, her father visited her at Wilton; he placed before her the finest of clothes and jewellery worn by royalty, while her mother placed before her religious objects. Goscelin claims that Edith chose what her mother offered her. Ridyard states that Goscelin emphasizes this incident, along with her concern and service to criminals and for the sick and the destitute, to demonstrate Edith's humility. Ridyard also states that Goscelin describes a ceremony, attended by her father and other royal officials, on the occasion of her entry into and commitment to religious life.

Career 
Goscelin reports that Edith "always dressed magnificantly", wearing what Baring-Gould calls "gay clothing". When admonished for it by Æthelwold, Bishop of Winchester, Edith responded, "My father, the mind may be as modest and God-fearing under fine clothes as under a serge habit. The God I love looks to the heart and not to the dress". Hollis reports that Edith's wardrobe choices were vindicated when a candle was accidentally dropped into a chest that stored her clothes; the chest was burnt but her clothes remained untouched and the chest remained in the convent as a reminder of the miracle. When researching Vita Edithe, his hagiography about Edith, Goscelin viewed her possessions, including "a sumptuous linen alb" she had designed and embroidered, a skill aristocratic women educated in convents like Wilton learned along with literacy, languages, and the arts and which she wore on special occasions like the reception of royalty or bishops and on high feast days.

According to Hollis, Goscelin resolves the apparent contradiction between Edith's humility and her rejection of her royal status with her practice of wearing fine clothing by reporting that her status obliged her to do so in order to maintain the court's patronage of Wilton, which Hollis states "might have rivalled a royal court in its display of affluence", but that she wore them reluctantly and with a cilice underneath. It is also how Goscelin explains other behaviours such as her design and creation of ecclesiastical vestments, her possession of a menagerie of exotic native and imported animals and "a metal casket for heating her bath water", and her and her mother's rebuilding of the convent, which included a chapel built and designed by Edith. Goscelin implies that she held positions of power and influence at her father's court and probably at the courts of her half-brothers Edward the Martyr and Æthelred II. Hollis calls Edith's manner of dress "evidently habitual", relating Goscelin's story about Edith assisting the workmen who built her chapel by carrying stones in her sleeves and his insistence that her fine clothing, her involvement in royal politics, and her periodic visits to her father's court did not make her less approachable to "the common people". Goscelin also relates that she "was highly regarded by the nobility of England and abroad; foreign kings and their ambassadors sought her favour by letters and gifts, and high-ranking ecclesiastics sought her intercession". Katie Ann-Marie Bugyis reports that according to Goscelin, Edith copied a manual of prayers used at Wilton Abbey, which the nuns there preserved as her relics. Goscelin praised Edith for her many talents, which included singing, embroidery, painting, writing, composing, praying, and "a blazing intellect in reading".

When Edith was fifteen, her father appointed her abbess of three other convents, Nunnaminster, Barking, and Wilton, which she refused, preferring instead "the obscurity of the cloister" and choosing to remain at Wilton with her mother. According to Bugyis, however, Edith was abbess of the three convents, and was installed by Æthelwold, although she protested the promotion on the basis of her lack of maturity but eventually agreed out of respect for Æthelwold's and her father's authority. She chose to live at Wilton with her mother, appointing two other women to manage the other communities in her absence. Goscelin stated that Edith's insisted on staying under the authority of her mother not because she felt incompetent, but "by an overabundance of humility". Goselin reported that Edith was an effective abbess of the communities despite her distance and that she visited them often. Very little about Edith's governence is known of her governance of Nunnaminster and Barking outside of Goselin's works about her.

Goscelin relates, in an anecdote Hollis calls a possible "hagiographic invention", that in 978, after the murder of her half-brother Edward the Martyr, Edith was offered the throne by opponents of Æthelred II, which she also refused. Dunbar relates an anecdote regarding Edith's dream about losing her right eye, which Edith believed foretold her brother's imminent death. Ridyard calls the anecdote about the offer "highly improbable" and "the creation of an eleventh-century hagiographic imagination which found in the story of Edith's rejection of the earthly a poignant illustration of her devotion to the heavenly". Hollis that it likely occurred because it was an attempt to legitimize the succession of Æthelred and because it was consistent with Edith's manner of dress and her close involvement in royal politics. Ridyard states that Goscelin relates both stories, Edith's refusal to accept a promotion to abbess and her rejection of the throne, in order to emphasize "the saint's extreme reluctance to accept a position of authority and influence".

A seal, created during Edith's lifetime was adopted and used as its official emblem until Wilton Abbey the abbey was dissolved in 1539. Bugyis states that it "figures her in half-length, frontal view, raising her right hand in a sign of benediction and holding up a book, perhaps the manual of prayers she copied, with her left hand". According to Alison Hudson, an archivist at the British Library, Edith's seal gives "a rare contemporary insight into the priorities, identities and possibly even the jewellery of a young princess in late tenth century England". Goscelin also describes two relics of Edith's rule over Nunnaminster, both of which he considered full of mystical significance and were still used by the community when he wrote about them: an alb (mentioned above) and a flowering rod, which was reminiscent of Aaron's rod and symbolized her innocence and "virginal fecundity", and continued to grow even after her death. 

According to Bugyis, Edith's alb demonstrated both her identification with Mary Magdalene's need to be forgiven of her sins and be remembered for her faith, devotion, and piety, and her view of her office as abbess. As Bugyis states, the alb "reflected the virtue she prized most in a monastic leader—humility", a duty the Benedictine Rule required from its monastic leaders, washing the feet in humble service for members of their communities, as Christ washed his disciples' feet and the woman (often conflated with Mary Magdalene) washed Christ's feet in the Gospel of John. Bugyis also states that Edith might have placed herself as Magdalene on her alb in order to represent her value of serving the poor and the outcast. Edith's choice of the costly gems, golden thread, and pearls might have also demonstrated the conflict between her roles as abbess and as the king's daughter, as well as a way to inspire her sisters and to provide them with a model of her kind of service and leadership to the community. The alb also demonstrated that "the liturgical and pastoral ministries of medieval monastic leaders were often inextricably entwined".

Edith's duties as abbess, both before and after her death, included releasing prisoners and sinners, condeming property violators, and pardoning relic thieves.

Death 
In 984, Edith built a chapel at Wilton Abbey dedicated to St Denys. According to Ridyard, Goscelin's account about the chapel's dedication "is skillfully juxaposed with an account of Edith's rejection of an earthly kingdom and is intended to be a final and dramatic illustration of her commitment to the heavenly" and supports his themes in her Vita about how King Edgar's patronage of the abbey served "the purposes of the heavenly kingdom". Ridyard called the construction of the chapel "Edith's last and most spectacular act of patronage". Goscelin reports that the chapel was dedicated by St Dunstan; towards the end of the ceremony, he foretold that she would die in three weeks. Dustan was impressed by the way she made the sign of the cross, described by Hollis as executed "idiosyncratically and repeatedly". Dunstan clasped her right hand, and weeping, said, "Never shall this thumb which makes the sign of our salvation see corruption". She died as he foretold, at the age of 23, on September 16, 984.

According to Hollis, Goscelin reports that at the moment of Edith's death, a nun went to the door of the abbey's church, and looking in, she saw "angels standing in ranks and singing sweetly"; then one angel with a shining face came up to the nun and told her, "Go back; the angels await the good maiden". Edith was buried at St Denys' chapel as she directed. Ridyard states that the nuns at Wilton, including her own mother, began to experience strange events at her tomb. Goscelin reports that Dunstan, who might have been her spiritual mentor, was present at Edith's deathbed and presided at her burial. Thirty days after Edith's death, she appeared to Wulfthryth in a vision, assuring her that "she had been well received by her king in eternal grace" and that "the devil had tried to accuse her, but she had broken his head". Dustan presided at her translation, which occurred on November 3, 987. Her thumb, as Dunstan had foretold, had not decomposed; it was enshrined separately and as Baring-Gould says, was "long exposed to the veneration of pilgrims."

According to Ridyard, Edith's feast, 16 September, is recorded in five 10th- and 11th-century calendars. The feast of her translation, 3 November, is recorded in two calendars of the period.

Legacy 

Ridyard calls Goscelin's Vita Edithe "a vocation narrative" and one of the "defensive hagiographies" written during the period "to vindicate not only the status of a saint but also the history, the traditions and the political status of a religious community with which that saint was associated" and "an act of monastic propaganda on a grand scale". Hollis, however, considers it one of the "only surviving near-contemporary accounts of female communities in the late Anglo-Saxon period”, an important historical document, and the earliest and most important source about Edith's legend and cult. Goscelin claims that he wrote the Vita at the request of both the Wilton community and his patron, Bishop Herman of Salisbury. He claims that his main sources were the oral testimony of the Wilton nuns and their abbess, as well as "from existing books". The Vita was dedicated to Lanfranc, the Archbishop of Canterbury. Goscelin might have written another volume about the Wilton community, the Wilton Chronicle, which also included stories about Edith.

Eve of Wilton, the Benedictine nun, anchoress, and later abbess of Wilton, about whom Goscelin also wrote a hagiography, had a devotion to Edith. According to Hollis, the community began to increase their devotion to Edith and experience more visions of her during Eve's tenure. A later Wilton abbess, Godiva (1090), commissioned Goscelin to write Vita Edithe in 1080 because Wilton "needed the assistance of a powerful supporter". Hollis states that because of Edith's lack of popularity at Wilton and promotion of her cult in the decades following her death, the memories of the nuns who  lived there were not subject to what Hollis calls "hagiolatrous transformations and inventions". Much of the information Goscelin gathered about Edith came from Brihtgifu (d. 1065), the daughter of noble parents, who came to the abbey as a child during Wulfthryth's lifetime and later became abbess in the years immediately before the Norman Conquest (c. 1040–1065). Brihtgifu, as Goscelin reports, received her call to religious life from Edith, who was promised to be Brihtgifu's godmother but died before her birth. During Brihtgifu's baptism by the bishop at Winchester Cathedral, Edith appeared and helped the infant grasp her baptismal candle; the bishop instructed Brihtgifu's parents to send her to Wilton to be raised and educated. Bugyis also considered Edith's choice to serve as a godparent important part of Edith's role as a spiritual mother as a part of her duties as abbess because monks and nuns were forbidden to serve as godparents beginning in the sixth century.

According to Ridyard, Edith "lived on in the memory of the Wilton nuns", although Hollis reports that there were few miracles supporting Edith's sainthood in the years following her death. Edith's mother Wulfthryth expressed her grief with commemorative masses and by building an almshouse in Edith's memory, but she tended to resist the making public of the only miracle reported immediately after Edith's death, Edith's retaliation against a young woman, not identified as a nun, who attempted to steal one of Edith's relics. Goscelin writes that after Edith's death, a group of foreign clerks were unable to remove Edith's relics from Wilton because the relics became too heavy to move, which according to Ridyard, is a common theme in hagiographic literature, in which the saint expresses their preferences about their tomb and relics.

Sainthood 
Edith was elevated to sainthood by her half-brother King Æthelred II, with the support of Dunstan and other ecclesiastical support, 13 years after her death. Ridyard explains the reason for the interval between her death and the development of her cult, even though "the scene seems set for the smooth and rapid development of Edith's cult" by stating that her promotion to sainthood was removed from the control of the Wilton nuns and taken over by "a number of prominent individuals", all of whom received visions of Edith urging them to elevate her remains. She appeared to Æthelred, to an official with a rank second to the king, to an "unnamed secular magnate", and to Dunstan, who was reminded of his prophecy about her incorruption and was ordered to travel to Wilton, "where he would find the body not only incorrupt but also raised up, as though already prepared to leave the tomb". Dunstan received another vision by St Denys, who directed him to perform Edith's translation, which occurred  and solidified the development of her cult. Ridyard states that both Æthelred and Cnut supported the promotion of her cult to establish the legitimacy of their reigns and to connect themselves to Edgar's children. As Ridyard put it, "The Wilton nuns must have been aware from the outset of at least some of those political implications and of their potential usefulness".

Shortly after her translation, there were two attempted relic thefts, one by a Wilton nun who tried to steal Edith's headband but was stopped when Edith's own head was "menacingly raised against her". and the other by a monk from Glastonbury, who was horrified when he tried to remove a fragment of Edith's clothing from her grave and his knife slipped and touched her body; "a wave of blood gushed forth, as if drawn from a living vein". King Cnut, who reigned England beginning in 1016, had a devotion to Edith after she interceded on his behalf and saved him from a seastorm, the reason, along with wanting to associate himself with Æthelred and his family, he built Edith a golden shrine storing her relics. Cnut, "through divine intervention on Edith's behalf", was able to punish some craftsmen who attempted to steal gold from it and as Ridyard puts it, "Divine vengeance followed quickly" when the workmen were struck blind. Edith performed few miracles between her translation and Cnut's death in 1035, including two healings of Wilton nuns. In the late 1030s, a nobleman named Agamund who had stolen Wilton properties had a vision of Edith on his deathbed, in which she tormented him by preventing him from dying in peace and entering heaven until he returned them; Hollis states this story "testifies to fear of Edith among the laity". As Bugyis put it, Edith's had dominion over both the condemnation and salvation of individual souls and demonstrated both her power of judgment and forgiveness, especially as it related to the violation of her community's spiritual and temporal possessions.

According to Ridyard, Edith "terrorised those who were foolish enough to invade the lands of her church and instilled fear in the hearts of those who might be tempted to emulate those invaders". Another man named Brexius seized land owned by the abbey and refused to make amends on his deathbed. His relative who was also a nun at Wilton reported having a vision in which she witnessed "the rough treatment which he subsequently received at the hands of the saint". Ridyard also reports that not only did Edith protect the convent's properties, she protected, at times violently, "one further possession which was essential to its prestige, its prosperity and even its identity—the body of St Edith herself", as well as the right of the Wilton community to control her remains and the relics associated with her life and burial. For example, a woman trying to steal the linen frontal from Edith's tomb was miraculously unable to move. Goscelin relates another miracle, of uncertain date, in which a nun ordered a dying child's mother out of the room where Edith's mother Wulfthryth died because the nun thought it was disrespectful; the mother brought the baby to Edith's shrine by mistake, but the child was miraculously healed.

Edith's cult did not seem to have been established in the Wilton community until , when she appeared in almost identical dreams to Ælfgifu, the wife of Æthelred II (who promoted Edith's cult) and Ælfflæd, wife of King Edward the Elder. Edith prophesied that Ælfgifu, would become abbess of Wilton. Ælfgifu's devotion to Edith began after Edith healed Ælfgifu of an eye disease during a dream vision. Edith's prophesy came true, but Ælfgifu's tenure was short (c. 1065–1067) also as Edith had predicted. Goscelin writes that Edith chose Ælfgifu to be her successor via a vision received by Ælfgifu and her mentor, Ælfhild, during the tenure of Edith's godchild Brihtgifu as abbess. Edith emerged from her tomb and appeared to Ælfgifu while she was praying before another abbess' tomb. Edith bestowed symbols of convent authority upon Ælfgifu, which Bugyis argues justified and endoresed the community's choice of their abbesses during a time when such decisions were made by kings and nobles. Edith's bestowal of the objects to Ælfgifu was also viewed as a sacramental act usually performed by a bishop.

In another vision, Ælfgifu made a deathbed request for Edith's relics and intercession; as she lay dying, Edith told an unnamed nun through a verbal communication in the nun's sleep that the Virgin Mary, through Edith's intercession, "was waiting with a choir of virgin saints to receive her soul".  After Ælfgifu's burial, however, Edith told another unnamed nun during a dream vision that the community should pray for Ælfgifu because Edith "had obtained forgiveness from the Lord for all but one of Ælfgifu's offenses, and that she would not cease to intercede for Ælfgifu until she obtained pardon for this offense". As Ridyard put it, however, "The purposes of the monastic patron, however, were not served exclusively by dire threats and dreadful punishments". For example, after King Cnut was saved from a seastorm through Edith's intercession, he expressed his gratitude by endowing gifts to the Wilton convent. Ridyard considers this miracle an example of the connection between Edith's "performance of conventional curative miracles" and the popular and widespread recognition of her cult.

Hollis reports that Wilton's faith in Edith had declined in the years following the Norman Conquest because despite being their patron saint, she had failed to help them recover some of the land and fortune they had lost and to protect them from a plague. Up to that point, Edith was remembered more for her wardrobe, her private zoo, her political influence, her artistic and literary talents, and the church she built and decorated, than for her holy life and miraculous powers. As both Hollis and Ridyard points out, the Wilton nuns saw Edith as indifferent to her own convent's interests, even when the nuns there were stricken by illness; as Hollis put it, "It wasn't that she couldn't help them, apparently, but that she wouldn't; either that or she was the laziest saint in England". Edith countered their expectations of her by communicating in "an unattributed dream vision" describing her obligations as a universal saint and that it was her duty to assist everyone who asked for it because she saw no one as an outsider. Edith also affirmed her special relationship with Wilton, but that they had to "accept their temporal sufferings as a means of becoming spotless brides of the Lord". Ridyard reports, however, that Goscelin attributes to both Edith and Wulfthryth "a number of domestic cures". 

Goscelin reports that Edith performed miracles that demonstrated her concern for prisoners and sinners. For example, after a pilgim from Saxony, along with his twelve companions, were sentenced to being shackled together for a year, which resulted in perpetual movement that did not stop when they were released. The pilgrim travelled to Wilton, slept before Edith's tomb for three days, and the awoke to find himself healed, thus releasing him from judgment of his crimes. Goscelin compared this miracle and others to the binding and loosing as described in the Gospel of Matthew and that "it superseded the power that was given to the apostles' priestly successors—whatever they bound as punishment for sin, she could ultimately loose".

Notes

References

Works cited 

 
 
 
 
 
 
 
 

960s births
980s deaths
10th-century English nuns
10th-century Christian saints
Anglo-Saxon royalty
Anglo-Saxon saints
Anglo-Saxon nuns
People from Sevenoaks
Female saints of medieval England
House of Wessex
English princesses
People from Kemsing
English Roman Catholic saints
English Roman Catholics
History of Catholicism in England